Stealing Sheep are a pop band from Liverpool, England, who formed in 2010. The three members are Rebecca Hawley (vocals and keys), Emily Lansley (vocals, guitar, bass guitar) and Luciana Mercer (vocals and drum kit).

The band released The Mountain Dogs and I Am the Rain both in 2011. Those were collected on Noah and the Paper Moon in 2012. The debut studio album Into the Diamond Sun was released in 2012 by Heavenly Recordings.

The band's second album, Not Real, was released on 13 April 2015 and their third, Big Wows, followed on 19 April 2019.

The band's influences include the Knife, Kraftwerk, Talking Heads, Moondog, Sia, Daft Punk and Can.

Discography
Studio albums
Into the Diamond Sun (2012, Heavenly Recordings)
Not Real (2015, Heavenly Recordings)
Big Wows (2019, Heavenly Recordings)
 La Planète Sauvage (2021, Fire Records, with The Radiophonic Workshop)
 Wow Machine (2022, Both Sides Records)

EPs
Stealing Sheep (2009, self-released)
What If the Lights Went Out? (2010, self-released)
The Mountain Dogs (2011, Red Deer Club)
I Am the Rain (2011, Red Deer Club) 
Noah and the Paper Moon (2012, Heavenly Recordings)

References

External links
 Official website

British indie pop groups
Musical groups from Liverpool
All-female bands
Heavenly Recordings artists
English pop music groups
British musical trios